The Royal Institute of British Architects (RIBA) is a professional body for architects primarily in the United Kingdom, but also internationally, founded for the advancement of architecture under its royal charter granted in 1837, three supplemental charters and a new charter granted in 1971.

Founded as the Institute of British Architects in London in 1834, the RIBA retains a central London headquarters at 66 Portland Place as well as a network of regional offices. Its members played a leading part in promotion of architectural education in the United Kingdom; the RIBA Library, also established in 1834, is one of the three largest architectural libraries in the world and the largest in Europe. The RIBA also played a prominent role in the development of UK architects' registration bodies.

The institute administers some of the oldest architectural awards in the world, including RIBA President's Medals Students Award, the Royal Gold Medal, and the Stirling Prize. It also manages RIBA Competitions, organising architectural and other design-related competitions.

The RIBA was historically a male-dominated body, first admitting women members in 1898, and appointing its first female president in 2009. Sometimes perceived as a London-centric organisation, it has also been accused of lacking transparency.

History 
Originally named the Institute of British Architects in London, it was formed in 1834 by several prominent architects, including Decimus Burton, Philip Hardwick, Thomas Allom, William Donthorne, Thomas Leverton Donaldson, William Adams Nicholson, John Buonarotti Papworth, and Thomas de Grey, 2nd Earl de Grey. The latter served as the institute's first president for 25 years until his death in 1859.

After the grant of the royal charter it had become known as the Royal Institute of British Architects in London, eventually dropping the reference to London in 1892. In 1934, it moved to its current headquarters on Portland Place, with the building being opened by King George V and Queen Mary.

Royal charter
It was granted its Royal Charter in 1837 under King William IV. Supplemental Charters of 1887, 1909 and 1925 were replaced by a single Charter in 1971, and there have been minor amendments since then.

The original Charter of 1837 set out the purpose of the Royal Institute to be: '... the general advancement of Civil Architecture, and for promoting and facilitating the acquirement of the knowledge of the various arts and sciences connected therewith...'

The operational framework is provided by the Byelaws, which are more frequently updated than the Charter. Any revisions to the Charter or Byelaws require the approval of the Privy Council.

Motto 
The design of the institute's Mycenaean lions medal and the Latin motto Usui civium, decori urbium has been attributed to Thomas Leverton Donaldson, who had been honorary secretary until 1839. The RIBA Guide to its Archive and History (Angela Mace,1986) records that the first official version of the badge of the Lion Gate at Mycenae was used as a bookplate for the institute's library and publications from 1835 to 1891, when it was redesigned by J. H. Metcalfe. It was again redesigned in 1931 by Eric Gill and in 1960 by Joan Hassall. The description in the 1837 by-laws was: "gules, two lions rampant guardant or, supporting a column marked with lines chevron, proper, all standing on a base of the same; a garter surrounding the whole with the inscription Institute of British Architects, anno salutis MDCCCXXXIV; above a mural crown proper, and beneath the motto Usui civium decori urbium ". The motto is translated "for the use of the people, for the glory of the city".

Architectural education
In the nineteenth and twentieth centuries the RIBA and its members had a leading part in the promotion of architectural education in the United Kingdom, including the establishment of the Architects' Registration Council of the United Kingdom (ARCUK) and the Board of Architectural Education under the Architects (Registration) Acts, 1931 to 1938. A member of the RIBA, Lionel Bailey Budden, then Associate Professor in the Liverpool University School of Architecture, had contributed the article on Architectural Education published in the fourteenth edition of the Encyclopædia Britannica (1929). His School, Liverpool, was one of the twenty schools named for the purpose of constituting the statutory Board of Architectural Education when the 1931 Act was passed.

Soon after the passing of the 1931 Act, in the book published on the occasion of the institute's centenary celebration in 1934, Harry Barnes, FRIBA, Chairman of the Registration Committee, mentioned that ARCUK could not be a rival of any architectural association, least of all the RIBA, given the way ARCUK was constituted. Barnes commented that the Act's purpose was not protecting the architectural profession, and that the legitimate interests of the profession were best served by the (then) architectural associations in which some 80 per cent of those practising architecture were to be found. 

The RIBA Guide to its Archive and History (1986) has a section on the "Statutory registration of architects" with a bibliography extending from a draft bill of 1887 to one of 1969. The Guide's section on "Education" records the setting up in 1904 of the RIBA Board of Architectural Education, and the system by which any school which applied for recognition, whose syllabus was approved by the Board and whose examinations were conducted by an approved external examiner, and whose standard of attainment was guaranteed by periodical inspections by a "Visiting Board" from the BAE, could be placed on the list of "recognized schools" and its successful students could qualify for exemption from RIBA examinations.

The content of the acts, particularly section 1 (1) of the amending act of 1938, shows the importance which was then attached to giving architects the responsibility of superintending or supervising the building works of local authorities (for housing and other projects), rather than persons professionally qualified only as municipal or other engineers. By the 1970s another issue had emerged affecting education for qualification and registration for practice as an architect, due to the obligation imposed on the United Kingdom and other European governments to comply with European Union Directives concerning mutual recognition of professional qualifications in favour of equal standards across borders, in furtherance of the policy for a single market of the European Union. This led to proposals for reconstituting ARCUK. Eventually, in the 1990s, before proceeding, the government issued a consultation paper "Reform of Architects Registration" (1994). The change of name to "Architects Registration Board" was one of the proposals which was later enacted in the Housing Grants, Construction and Regeneration Act 1996 and re-enacted as the Architects Act 1997; another was the abolition of the ARCUK Board of Architectural Education. 

RIBA Visiting Boards continue to assess courses for exemption from the RIBA's examinations in architecture. Under arrangements made in 2011 the validation criteria are jointly held by the RIBA and the Architects Registration Board, but unlike the ARB, the RIBA also validates courses outside the UK.

In 2005 Royal Institute of British Architects set up Academy of Urbanism.

In 2019 the RIBA Council voted for the creation of the RIBA Future Architects initiative, an online platform and international network aimed at Part I, Part II and Part III architectural students and graduates. The initiative was championed by student and associates' representatives on Council, after a 2018 campaign highlighting the hardship architectural students faced in their degrees. The initiative is designed to support, inspire and provide a voice as students and graduates transition from study to practice.

Structure
The RIBA is governed by the RIBA Council, a group of 60 members, elected from among the RIBA membership, the majority of whom are chartered architects.

The RIBA is a member organisation, with 44,000 members. Chartered Members are entitled to call themselves chartered architects and to append the post-nominals RIBA after their name; Student Members are not permitted to do so. Formerly, fellowships of the institute were granted, although no longer; those who continue to hold this title instead add FRIBA. Members gain access to all the institute's services and receive its monthly magazine the RIBA Journal and articles on its website, RIBAJ.com.

Designation
ARIBA: Associate of the Royal Institute of British Architects (no longer granted to new members)
FRIBA: Fellow of the Royal Institute of British Architects (and Hon Fellow – an honorary designation)
RIBA: Chartered member of the Royal Institute of British Architects
 The institute's president is designated PRIBA, past presidents use PPRIBA

Regions
The institute also maintains twelve regional offices around the United Kingdom, including a London regional office. The first regional office was the East of England, opened at Cambridge in 1966. Each region encompasses several local architectural groups. In February 2022, the RIBA was criticised for cost-cutting proposals to merge its offices across England into three 'super regions'.

 RIBA East – Great Shelford
 RIBA East Midlands – Nottingham
 RIBA London – London
 RIBA North East – Newcastle
 RIBA North West – Liverpool
 RIBA South / South East – Reading
 RIBA South West / Wessex – Bristol
 RIBA West Midlands – Birmingham
 RIBA Yorkshire – Leeds
 RIAS – Royal Incorporation of Architects in Scotland, Edinburgh
 RSAW – Royal Society of Architects in Wales, Cardiff
 RSUA – Royal Society of Ulster Architects, Belfast

There are also international branches under the RIBA International umbrella, with offices in London, Shanghai and Sharjah (United Arab Emirates). There are four principal membership groups:
 RIBA Americas – includes the RIBA USA Chapter
 RIBA Asia and Australasia
 RIBA Europe
 RIBA Middle East and Africa

RIBA Enterprises
RIBA Enterprises was the commercial arm of RIBA, with a registered office in Newcastle upon Tyne, a base at 76 Portland Place in London, and an office in Newark, later sold to allow further investment. It once employed over 250 staff, approximately 180 of whom were based in Newcastle. Its services include RIBA Insight, and RIBA Product Selector. It previously ran RIBA Publishing, RIBA Bookshops (which operates online and at 66 Portland Place), RIBA Appointments and RIBA Journal. These all now operate as part of the RIBA.

RIBA Enterprises also included the Newcastle-based NBS (National Building Specification), which had 130 staff and dealt with building regulations and the Construction Information Service. In June 2018, the RIBA announced it was selling a £31.8 million stake in RIBA Enterprises, to LDC, the private equity arm of Lloyds Bank. In November 2020, NBS was sold to Byggfakta Group, a Sweden-based information services provider. The RIBA received £172 million from the sale of its stake in NBS, some of which was reinvested to provide a reliable income stream for the institute.

The RIBA has been recognised as a business Superbrand since 2008.

RIBA headquarters

The RIBA's headquarters has been at 66 Portland Place, London, since 1934. This Grade II* listed building was designed by architect George Grey Wornum for the institute and features sculptures by Edward Bainbridge Copnall and James Woodford. The building is open to the public, and includes a library, architectural bookshop, a café, bar, exhibition galleries and lecture theatre. Rooms are hired out for events.

The organisation also owns an adjacent building at 76 Portland Place, a 1950s office building overhauled in 2013, which housed RIBA staff and a members' café. In September 2021, following the COVID-19 pandemic and an £8 million budget deficit in the year ending December 2020, the RIBA announced plans to sell 76 Portland Place and to reduce staff numbers. Chief executive Alan Vallance said 89% of RIBA's staff only wanted to work two or three days a week from an office, so 76 Portland Place was surplus to requirements. A potential 20 further redundancies were reported on 31 January 2022.

In January 2022, the RIBA announced an architectural competition for RIBA-chartered architectural practices for a £20 million "comprehensive refurbishment" of its 66 Portland Place HQ.

British Architectural Library

The British Architectural Library, sometimes referred to as the RIBA Library, was established in 1834 upon the founding of the institute with donations from members. Now, with over four million items, it is one of the three largest architectural libraries in the world and the largest in Europe. Some items from the collections are on permanent display at the Victoria and Albert Museum (V&A) in the V&A + RIBA Architecture Gallery and included in temporary exhibitions at the RIBA and across Europe and North America. Its collections include:

Archives: 1.5 million items made up of architects' personal papers, correspondence, notebooks and diaries.
Audiovisual materials: Talks held at the RIBA, including talks by winners of the Royal Gold Medal.
Biographical files: 20,000 biographical files relating to a specific architect or firm. Files contain a mix of nomination papers for membership of the RIBA, obituaries, brochures, articles and letters.
Books: 150,000 books and 20,000 pamphlets, with the earliest book dating from 1478. Amongst the items is a first edition of Andrea Palladio's I quattro libri dell'architettura from 1570 and John Tallis's Tallis's London street views from 1838 to 1840.
Drawings: 1 million items are held. These predominantly cover British architects from the Renaissance to the present day, such as Ernő Goldfinger, Charles Holden and Edwin Lutyens. It holds the world's largest collection of drawings by Andrea Palladio.
Models: Examples come from architects such as Denys Lasdun for his Keeling House and National Theatre, London.
Periodicals: 2,000 architectural titles collected, with complete sets of Architectural Review, Architects' Journal, and Country Life.
Photographs: 1.5 million items, including the archive of the Architectural Press. Items date from the 19th century, but with major holdings of 20th-century photographers such as Eric de Maré, John Maltby, John Donat and Henk Snoek.

The overcrowded conditions of the library was one of the reasons why the RIBA moved from 9 Conduit Street (where it had been since 1859) to larger premises at 66 Portland Place in 1934. The library remained open throughout World War II and was able to shelter the archives of Modernist architect Adolf Loos during the war.

The library is based at two public sites: the Reading Room at the RIBA's headquarters, 66 Portland Place, London; and the RIBA Architecture Study Rooms in the Henry Cole Wing of the V&A. The Reading Room, designed by the building's architect George Grey Wornum and his wife Miriam, retains its original 1934 Art Deco interior with open bookshelves, original furniture and double-height central space. The study rooms, opened in 2004, were designed by Wright & Wright Architects. The library is funded entirely by the RIBA but it is open to the public without charge. It operates a free learning programme aimed at students, education groups and families, and an information service for RIBA members and the public through the RIBA Information Centre.

V&A + RIBA Architecture Partnership

Since 2004, through the V&A + RIBA Architecture Partnership, the RIBA and V&A have worked together to promote the understanding and enjoyment of architecture.

In 2004, the two institutions created the Architecture Gallery (Room 128) at the V&A showing artefacts from the collections of both institutions, this was the first permanent gallery devoted to architecture in the UK. The adjacent Architecture Exhibition Space (Room 128a) is used for temporary displays related to architecture. Both spaces were designed by Gareth Hoskins Architects. At the same time the RIBA Library Drawing and Archives Collections moved from 21 Portman Place to new facilities in the Henry Cole Wing at the V&A. Under the Partnership new study rooms were opened where members of the public could view items from the RIBA and V&A architectural collections under the supervision of curatorial staff. These and the nearby education room were designed by Wright & Wright Architects.

In June 2022, the RIBA announced it would be terminating its partnership with the V&A in 2027, "by mutual agreement", ending the permanent architecture gallery at the museum. Artefacts will be transferred back to the RIBA's existing collections, with some rehoused at the institute's headquarters at 66 Portland Place building, set to become a new House of Architecture following a £20 million refurbishment.

RIBA Awards

The RIBA has been awarding the President's Medals annually since 1836, making them the institute's oldest awards, and possibly the oldest awards worldwide in the field of architecture. The Institute runs many other awards including the Stirling Prize for the best new building of the year; the Royal Gold Medal (first awarded in 1848), which honours a distinguished body of work; the Stephen Lawrence Prize, sponsored by the Marco Goldschmied Foundation, for projects with a construction budget of less than £1,000,000, and the President's Awards for Research. The RIBA European Award was inaugurated in 2005 for work in the European Union, outside the UK.  The RIBA National Award and the RIBA International Award were established in 2007. Since 1966, the RIBA also judges regional awards which are presented locally in the UK regions (East, East Midlands, London, North East, North West, Northern Ireland, Scotland, South/South East, South West/Wessex, Wales, West Midlands and Yorkshire). Inaugurated in 2001, the Manser Medal was renamed the RIBA House of the Year award in 2014.

RIBA competitions

RIBA Competitions is the Royal Institute of British Architects' unit dedicated to organising architectural and other design-related competitions.

Architectural design competitions are used by an organisation that plans to build a new building or refurbish an existing building. They can be used for buildings, engineering work, structures, landscape design projects or public realm artworks. A competition typically asks for architects and/or designers to submit a design proposal in response to a given Brief. The winning design will then be selected by an independent jury panel of design professionals and client representatives. The independence of the jury is vital to the fair conduct of a competition.

RIBA Plan of Work
The RIBA Plan of Work, first developed in 1963, is a stage-by-stage model considered "the definitive design and process management tool for the UK construction industry". The latest version is the RIBA Plan of Work 2020, which has eight stages, 0 to 7. This version replaced the 2013 version. Previously, the RIBA Outline Plan of Work 2007 used letters for each stage (stages A-L) rather than numbers.

RIBA work plan stages are often referred to in architectural, planning and procurement contexts, for example procurement notices may specify the relevant stages of work for which professional support is required.

Education

In addition to the Architects Registration Board, the RIBA provides accreditation to architecture schools in the UK under a procedure which validates courses at over 50 educational establishments across the UK. It also provides validation to international courses without input from the ARB.

The RIBA has three parts to the education process: Part I which is generally a three-year first degree, a year-out of at least one year work experience in an architectural practice precedes the Part II which is generally a two-year post graduate diploma or masters. A further year out must be taken before the RIBA Part III professional exams can be taken. Overall it takes a minimum of seven years before an architecture student can seek chartered status.

Criticism

Lack of representation
In common with other professional bodies established in the early 19th century, the RIBA was initially a men-only institution. Thomas Leverton Donaldson, the RIBA's first secretary aimed "To uphold ourselves the character of Architects as men of taste, men of science, men of honour"; this vision of the masculine architect largely excluded women from the architecture profession for decades. More than 60 years after its foundation, the RIBA first admitted women as members in 1898; the first female member was Ethel Charles (1871–1962), followed by her sister Bessie (1869–1932) in 1900. It was then more than 30 years before the RIBA elected its first woman fellow, Gillian Harrison (1898–1974), in 1931, and a further 77 years before RIBA nominated its first female president, Ruth Reed. There is no record of any of the buildings designed by the early women members.

In 1985, when under 5% of chartered architects were women, the Women Architects Forum was established. In 1993 the RIBA established a special interest group, the Women Architects Group; in 1999, renamed Women In Architecture, it became independent of the RIBA, which, in 2000, set up its first equality forum, Architects For Change. This became an umbrella group for Women In Architecture, the Society of Black Architects, student forum Archaos and other groups. In 2017, around 17% of architects were women, up from 8% in 1999.

The RIBA has been criticised by architects outside southeast England as a London-centric organisation which does not reach out to all members in the United Kingdom and beyond. The organisation has also been accused of institutional racism, of having a "deep, systemic disengagement from the membership", and of lacking transparency. In March 2022, young architects began a campaign to get the next RIBA president to move beyond "empty slogans and self-serving initiatives" and shake up an institute seen as "out of touch" with the wider profession. The campaign included members of a grassroots organisation, the Future Architects Front (FAF), and the institute’s Future Architects Steering Group; their preferred candidate, Muyiwa Oki, was named on 6 May 2022. Days later, the RIBA announced a restriction on new members participating in the elections (starting on 28 June 2022), a rule change described by the FAF as "an outrageous lack of transparency" and "exclusionary tactics".

Also in May 2022, a RIBA director, Dian Small, highlighted the lack of diversity at an RIBA awards event, suggesting black architects "were not invited". On 26 May 2022, the RIBA's first director of diversity and inclusion, Marsha Ramroop, left after 13 months with the organisation. In December 2022, the RIBA decided not to "proceed with the development and sale of an equality, diversity and inclusion (EDI) guidance book for practices, originally planned for 2024". The RIBA had commissioned Ramroop to write the book; she said she was "extremely disappointed that RIBA has taken the decision not to go ahead with publishing it."

Governance

Questions about RIBA transparency were also raised by Alan Jones during his presidency (2019–2021). Between 31 March and 15 June 2020, he temporarily stepped back over a matter in his private life, reported by the RIBA as a "serious incident" to the Charity Commission. After an independent investigation, Jones resumed his role as president on 15 June 2020. In July 2021, he stepped down as a RIBA trustee, feeling unable to support a proposal to renew the contract of the RIBA chief executive, Alan Vallance, having made "serious allegations" about Vallance's conduct in February 2020. Senior figures demanded the body 'come clean' about the conflict saying "The RIBA is becoming an increasingly secretive organisation. ... Confidentiality has been weaponised and woe betide anyone who wants to ask difficult questions...." A Council Board Advisory Group was established, with a QC investigating complaints. Jones told Architects' Journal that he had come under pressure from senior RIBA figures to resign, and felt that "in terms of [RIBA's] transparency and accountability, there is room for improvement."

A RIBA council member, Kerr Robertson, was removed as a councillor in October 2022. Described by Architects' Journal as a whistleblower, Robertson had criticised RIBA's board about issues including alleged conflicts of interest, institutional bullying, trustee interference in RIBA election rules changes, and a data breach.

Presidents
Presidents of the RIBA are elected by RIBA members, serve a two-year term and chair the RIBA Council. The post was created in 1835, shortly after the institute's founding. In 2009, 174 years later, Ruth Reed became the institute's first female president.

The current RIBA president, serving from September 2021 to August 2023 is Simon Allford. In August 2022, Muyiwa Oki was named as Alford's successor, set to take office on 1 September 2023.

Secretaries 
The role of secretary of the RIBA was established in 1871. Between 1835 and 1870, the secretarial duties of the institute fell to honorary secretaries. Recent and current holders of the role are now referred to as chief executive.

 1871–1878 Charles Eastlake
 1878–1896 William H. White
 1897–1907 William John Locke
 1908–1943 Sir Ian MacAlister
 1945–1959 Cyril Douglas Spragg
 1959–1968 Gordon Randolph Ricketts
 1968–1987 Patrick Harrison
 1987–1994 Bill Rodgers
 1994–2000 Alexander Reid
 2000–2009 Richard Hastilow 
 2009–2016 Harry Rich
 2016–2022 Alan Vallance

See also
 Royal Town Planning Institute
 Chartered Institute of Architectural Technologists
 Chartered Institute of Building
 Construction Industry Council
 Joint Contracts Tribunal
 RIBA Knowledge Communities
 The Georgian Group

References

Bibliography
 H.M. Colvin, A Biographical Dictionary of British Architects, 1600–1840 (1997) 
 Charles Read Earl de Grey (2007), published by Willow Historical Monographs

External links
 RIBA official website
 British Architectural Library The RIBA's books, journals, photographs, drawings and archives collections
 RIBA/BALT library catalogue online
 RIBA Catalogue locations and current access
 RIBA  Schools list
 RIBA President's Medals Student Awards
 RIBApix Images from the RIBA's collections
 RIBA Competitions
 RIBA official architecture bookshop
 The RIBA Journal

Video clips
 RIBA Architecture YouTube channel
 RIBA International Dialogues: Architecture and Climate Change Talk series Video archive of the lectures
 NBS TV

 
1834 establishments in the United Kingdom
1834 in art
Architecture-related professional associations
Architecture organisations based in the United Kingdom
Commonwealth Association of Architects
Libraries in the City of Westminster
Organisations based in London with royal patronage
Organisations based in the City of Westminster
Organizations established in 1834
British Architects
Registration of architects in the United Kingdom